Estadio Chihuahua is a stadium in Chihuahua, Mexico. It is primarily used for baseball, and is the home field of the Dorados de Chihuahua baseball team of the Mexican League.  It holds 14,500 people and opened in 2005.

References

External links
Photo of stadium

2005 establishments in Mexico
Chihuahua
Estadio Chihuahua
Sports venues completed in 2005
Sports venues in Chihuahua (state)
Estadio Chihuahua